The Best Of Collection – Christmas Rocks! is a compilation album from the American swing revival band The Brian Setzer Orchestra, released in 2008.

Track listing
 "Jingle Bells"
 "Gettin' In The Mood (For Christmas)"
 "Boogie Woogie Santa Claus"
 "Nutcracker Suite"
 "You're A Mean One, Mr. Grinch"
 "Dig That Crazy Santa Claus"
 "Winter Wonderland"
 "(Everybody's Waitin' For) The Man With The Bag"
 "Angels We Have Heard On High"
 "White Christmas"
 "Baby It's Cold Outside"
 "Santa Claus is Coming to Town"
 "Let It Snow"
 "My Favorite Things"
 "Jingle Bell Rock"
 "Sleigh Ride"
 "Santa Drives a Hot Rod"
 "Christmas Island"
 "Bach's Bounce"
 "Take a Break Guys"
Track 19 is an adaptation of Johann Sebastian Bach's "Jesu, Joy of Man's Desiring" 
Track 20 is an adaptation of the traditional "God Rest, Ye Merry Gentlemen"

References

2008 Christmas albums
Christmas albums by American artists
Swing Christmas albums
The Brian Setzer Orchestra albums
Surfdog Records compilation albums
2008 compilation albums”Nutcraker Suite” is a Stan Kenton arrangement